Jonathan Philp (born 1960) is an Australian diplomat and career officer with the Department of Foreign Affairs and Trade.

Career
Philp was appointed as Australian ambassador to Afghanistan on 9 August 2012. He presented his credentials to Afghan President Hamid Karzai on 31 January 2013. Prior to his ambassadorial appointment, Philp was the Assistant Secretary, International Organisations Branch and Assistant Secretary, Consular Operations Branch. He previously served overseas as Ambassador to Turkey; Deputy Head of Mission, Myanmar, and has had postings to Saudi Arabia, Vientiane, London, Nairobi and Madrid.

Philp holds a Bachelor of Arts (Honours) from the Australian National University. He speaks Arabic and French.

Postings
 1986–1988 – Third Secretary, Australian Embassy in Riyadh
 1992–1995 – Deputy Head of Mission, Australian Embassy in Yangon
 1996–1998 – Director, Southeast Asian Issues
 1999 – Assistant Secretary, Diplomatic Security Branch
 2001–2004 – Ambassador, Australian Embassy in Ankara
 2004–2007 – Head of International Relations, Woodside Petroleum
 2008–2009 – Somalia Taskforce, Nairobi
 2009–2011 – Assistant Secretary, Consular Operations Branch
 2012 – Assistant Secretary, International Organisations Branch
 2013–2015 – Ambassador, Australian Embassy in Kabul
 2015–2017 – First Assistant Secretary, Consular and Crisis Management Division
 2018–2020 – Head of Mission/Chargé d' Affaires, Australian Embassy in Athens (accredited to Greece, Bulgaria, Romania)
 2020–present – High Commissioner to Papua New Guinea

References

|-

|-

1960 births
Ambassadors of Australia to Afghanistan
Ambassadors of Australia to Turkey
Australian National University alumni
Living people